PMX can refer to:

 Pacific Media Expo, a multi-genre convention held since 2004 in California.
 PMX (technology) to generate local weather information 
 Microsoft Premium Mobile Experiences team, responsible for the KIN phones
 PMX-1000, a computer system-on-a-chip
 A very compact notation for typesetting music; also the preprocessor which expands that notation to MusiXTeX code.
 Pharmacometrics, a discipline that develops mathematical models of biology, pharmacology, disease, and physiology.

 Beretta PMX, a submachine gun produced by Italian firearm maker Beretta